Sir George Chetwynd (1916–1982) was a British lecturer and politician.

George Chetwynd may also refer to:

George Chetwynd (civil servant) (1824–1882), Receiver and Accountant General of the British Post Office
Sir George Chetwynd, 1st Baronet (1739–1824), of the Chetwynd baronets
Sir George Chetwynd, 2nd Baronet (1783–1850), of the Chetwynd baronets, MP for Stafford
Sir George Chetwynd, 3rd Baronet (1808–1869), of the Chetwynd baronets
Sir George Chetwynd, 4th Baronet (1849–1917), of the Chetwynd baronets
Sir George Guy Chetwynd, 5th Baronet (1874–1935), of the Chetwynd baronets

See also
Chetwynd (disambiguation)